Life and Love is an album by singer and songwriter Leon Russell. The album was recorded in Russell's new studios, Paradise Studios in Burbank, California, and produced and written by Russell. The album was first released as a vinyl LP, 8-track tape and cassette tape by Paradise Records and Warner Records in 1979, and re-released on CD in 2007 and 2012.

Russell used electronic drums on this album for the first time, courtesy of Roger Linn who had invented the Linn LM-1, a pioneering version of the drum machine, making Russell an early user of this new instrument. Roger Linn started a company Moffett Electronics to sell his electronic drums at the same time as Leon's Life and Love album in 1979.

Country Music: The Encyclopedia reviewed Life and Love: "A new collection of Leon's came out on Paradises titled Life and Love, that was consistently strong in music and performance. The Album present both sides of Leon - several fine country and country rock tracks and a number of blues rockers that harked back to his work in the early 1970."

After releasing Life and Love Leon Russell went on tour with the group New Grass Revival for two years. From that tour Leon released two live albums with New Grass Revival, The Live Album with The New Grass Revival and Live And Pickling Fast.

Track listing
All songs composed by Leon Russell.

Side one
 "One More Love Song" – 4:01
 "You Girl" – 3:26
 "Struck by Lightning" – 2:51
 "Strange Love" – 4:06
 "Life and Love" – 3:21

Side two
 "On the First Day" – 4:21
 "High Horse" – 4:41
 "Sweet Mystery" – 5:13
 "On the Borderline" – 2:15

Charts

Personnel
Leon Russell – guitar, keyboards, piano, vocals - Producer - Written-By 
Roger Linn – Co-producer - drums - Moffett Electronics - Engineer - Guitar
Marty Grebb – guitar, saxophone
Jody Payne, Roger Linn – guitar
Mickey Raphael – harmonica
Bernetta Rand - backing vocals
Frances Pye - backing vocals
Joe Chemay- backing vocals
 Lena Luckey- backing vocals
 Wornell Jones- backing vocals
 Tom Kemp - Photography

External links
youtube.com, "Sweet Mystery" from Life and Love
youtube.com, Song Life and Love from the Life and Love album
Leon Russell discography
Leon Russell lyrics
Leon Russell NAMM Oral History Program Interview (2012)

References

1979 albums
Leon Russell albums